The Cuban gnatcatcher (Polioptila lembeyei) is a species of bird in the family Polioptilidae, the gnatcatchers. It is endemic to Cuba.

Taxonomy and systematics

"The Cuban gnatcatcher was described by the most famous of this island’s ornithologists, the naturalised Juan (Johannes) Gundlach". It was named in honor of Juan Lembeye.

The Cuban gnatcatcher is monotypic.

Description

Like most members of the genus, the male is blue-gray above and white below. It has a unique black crescent behind the eye and ear coverts and a long black tail with white outer feathers. The female is similar but paler, and its facial crescent is thinner. The juvenile is olive-gray above and has buffy flanks, a creamy belly, and only a faint facial crescent.

Distribution and habitat

The Cuban gnatcatcher is found along much of the north and southeast coasts of Cuba and also in disjunct areas along the south coast. It inhabits xeric scrubland, mostly below  of elevation.

Behavior

Feeding

The Cuban gnatcatcher's diet has not been thoroughly documented; it is assumed to be small insects and spiders. It forages actively among the lower branches of vegetation.

Breeding

The Cuban gnatcatcher's breeding season extends from March to July. Its nest is a deep cup constructed by both sexes using hair, vegetable fibers, and small leaves and lined with softer material. The clutch size varies from two to five but is usually three. In a detailed study cited by Atwood et al (2020), 35 of 38 clutches were predated before the young fledged.

Vocalization

The Cuban gnatcatcher's song is "a sustained rambling, disorganized series of warbles, whistles and chattering notes" .

Status

The IUCN has assessed the Cuban gnatcatcher as being of Least Concern. However, "[its] restricted habitat is considered vulnerable to grazing and habitat conversion."

References

External links
Cuban Gnatcatcher videos on the Internet Bird Collection
Stamps (for Cuba) – 3 issues

Cuban gnatcatcher
Endemic birds of Cuba
Cuban gnatcatcher
Taxonomy articles created by Polbot